Gach is a surname with multiple origins. Notable people with the surname include: 
 Gary Gach (born 1947), American author, translator, and poet
 J. R. Gach (1952–2015), American talk radio host
 Jiří Gach (born 1969), Czech sports shooter
 Kacper Gach (born 1998), Polish footballer
 Richard Gach (1930–1991), Austrian architect

See also

References

Polish-language surnames
German-language surnames